Colleges That Change Lives began as a college educational guide first published in 1996 by Loren Pope. Colleges That Change Lives (CTCL) was founded in 1998 is a non-profit, 501(c)(3) based on Pope's book.

The book
Colleges That Change Lives is a book that explores college admissions in the United States and has four editions. It was first published in 1996, with a second edition in 2000, and a third edition in 2006. The final fourth edition (2013-2014) was published in 2012 after Pope's death, and was revised by Hilary Masell Oswald. A non-profit organization modeled after the book now carries the name.

The fourth edition profiles 40 choices for liberal arts colleges that, "have one primary mission: educate the undergraduate. Each appeals to a slightly different type of teenager, but they all share a mission to raise students' trajectories and develop thinkers, leaders, and moral citizens. The little-known truth is that these colleges have been on the cutting edge of higher education for decades. Many of them have outperformed most of the ranking sweethearts in the percentages of graduates who become America's scientists and scholars."

Colleges That Change Lives (CTCL)
Following Loren Pope's message, Colleges That Change Lives, Inc. (CTCL) was founded in 1998, two years after the first edition, and "independent of Mr. Pope (although with his blessing) and his publisher." It is recognized as a non-profit, 501(c)(3). According to the CTCL website:  
 CTCL was established to "as a way to keep Loren Pope's message alive." It is governed by a voluntary board of college counseling professionals. After the publication of the book, the colleges "began working together as a group of like-minded schools." A few years later, the non-profit was founded with Pope's approval. Then in 2012, Pope's family "hired Hilary Masell Oswald to revise the book again. She identified four more schools, and the organization invited them to join CTCL."

List of schools in the 2013-2014 edition
Northeast
Allegheny College — Meadville, Pennsylvania
Clark University — Worcester, Massachusetts
Juniata College — Huntingdon, Pennsylvania
Marlboro College — Marlboro, Vermont (now closed)
Ursinus College —Collegeville, Pennsylvania

Mid-Atlantic
Emory and Henry College — Emory, Virginia
Goucher College — Towson, Maryland
University of Lynchburg — Lynchburg, Virginia (previously Lynchburg College)
McDaniel College— Westminster, Maryland 
St. John's College — Annapolis, Maryland

South
Agnes Scott College — Decatur, Georgia
Birmingham-Southern College — Birmingham, Alabama
Centre College — Danville, Kentucky
Eckerd College — St. Petersburg, Florida
Guilford College — Greensboro, North Carolina
Hendrix College — Conway, Arkansas
Millsaps College — Jackson, Mississippi
 New College of Florida — Sarasota, Florida
Rhodes College — Memphis, Tennessee

Midwest
Beloit College — Beloit, Wisconsin
Cornell College — Mount Vernon, Iowa
Denison University — Granville, Ohio
Earlham College — Richmond, Indiana
Hillsdale College — Hillsdale, Michigan
Hiram College — Hiram, Ohio
Hope College — Holland, Michigan
Kalamazoo College — Kalamazoo, Michigan
Knox College — Galesburg, Illinois
Lawrence University — Appleton, Wisconsin
Ohio Wesleyan University — Delaware, Ohio
St. Olaf College — Northfield, Minnesota
Wabash College — Crawfordsville, Indiana
Wheaton College — Wheaton, Illinois
The College of Wooster — Wooster, Ohio

Southwest
Austin College — Sherman, Texas
St. John's College — Santa Fe, New Mexico 
Southwestern University — Georgetown, Texas

West
University of Puget Sound — Tacoma, Washington
Reed College — Portland, Oregon
Saint Mary's College of California — Moraga, California
Whitman College — Walla Walla, Washington
Willamette University — Salem, Oregon

Current list of CTCL schools
The current CTCL list of 44 schools contains all of the schools above (except for Marlboro College which closed in 2020), and places both branches of St. John's College under one listing. It restored The Evergreen State College, Hampshire College, and Antioch College to the list, which were all in the 1996, 2000, and 2006 editions. It also restored Bard College, which was in the 1996 edition.

Northwest
The Evergreen State College — Olympia, Washington

Northeast
Bard College  — Annandale-on-Hudson, New York
Hampshire College — Amherst, Massachusetts

Midwest
Antioch College — Yellow Springs, Ohio

Four editions

Notes

External links

Books about education
Non-profit organizations based in Texas
University and college admissions
2012 non-fiction books
Colleges That Change Lives
Penguin Books books